The Fiat 505 is a passenger car produced by Fiat between 1919 and 1925. The 505 was based on the same basic design as the four cylinder Fiat 501, but with a larger engine and bigger exterior dimensions.

30,000 examples of the Fiat 505 were produced.

References
Fiat Personenwagen, Fred Steiningen, 1994. 

505
Cars introduced in 1919
1920s cars